Chermin (Mirror) is a 2007 Malaysian Malay-language horror film directed by Zarina Abdullah.

Synopsis 
The story is about a girl named Nasrin who suffers disfiguring injuries in a car crash. Her mother discovers an antique mirror. The mirror is not an ordinary mirror; a spirit trapped inside it makes the mirror able to reflect what Nasrin wants to see. Nasrin becomes obsessed with the mirror. On a quest to regain her past beauty, Nasrin submits herself to the mirror spirit by satisfying the mirror's need for blood and revenge.

Cast

Main
 Deanna Yusoff as Mastura
 Natasha Hudson as Nasrin
 Khatijah Tan as Mak Siti
 Farid Kamil as Yusof

Supporting
 Maimon Mutalib as Mak Ngah
 Sheila Mambo as Minah
 Soffi Jikan as Zakaria
 Farah Ahmad as Rosnah
 Catriona Ross as Yasmin
 Haryanto Hassan as Hassan
 Lisdawati as Zahrah
 Mustapha Maarof as Pak Din
 Ghazali Abu Noh as the Bomoh

Awards and nominations

Awards
 2007: 20th Malaysian Film Festival: Most Promising Director: Zarina Abdullah
 2007: 20th Malaysian Film Festival: Most Promising Actress: Natasha Hudson

Awards nominated
 2007: 20th Malaysian Film Festival: Best Film
 2007: 20th Malaysian Film Festival: Best Sound Effect
 2007: 20th Malaysian Film Festival: Best Film Director
 2007: 20th Malaysian Film Festival: Best Actress
 2007: 20th Malaysian Film Festival: Best Actress in a Supporting Role
 2007: 20th Malaysian Film Festival: Best Screenplay
 2007: 20th Malaysian Film Festival: Best Cinematography
 2007: 20th Malaysian Film Festival: Best Editor
 2007: 20th Malaysian Film Festival: Best Original Music Score
 2007: 20th Malaysian Film Festival: Best Art Direction

Referencec

External links
 
 Zarina Abdullah's blog
 
 Review: Suanie.net
 Film Asia

2007 films
2007 horror films
Malay-language films
Malaysian horror films